In Greek mythology, Eurydice is the wife of the musician Orpheus.

Eurydice or Euridice may also refer to:

People 
 Eurydice, wife of Amyntas I of Macedon and mother of Alexander I of Macedon
 Eurydice I of Macedon, mother of the king of Macedonia, Philip II
 Eurydice II of Macedon (died 317 BC), wife of the nominal king of Macedonia, Philip Arrhidaeus
 Eurydice of Egypt, wife of Ptolemy I Soter, king of Egypt
 Cleopatra Eurydice of Macedon, wife of Philip II of Macedon
 Eurydice (wife of Antipater II of Macedon), daughter of Lysimachus and Nicaea
 Eurydice of Athens, one of the wives of Demetrius I Poliorcetes
 Eurydice Dixon (1995 – 2018), Australian comedian and actress murdered in a Melbourne park.

Mythological figures 
 Eurydice (Greek myth), various mythological figures
 Eurydice of Thebes, wife of the king Creon

Arts and entertainment
 Eurydice (Mallet play) a 1731 tragedy by David Mallet
 Eurydice (Anouilh play), a 1941 play by Jean Anouilh
 Eurydice (Ruhl play), a 2003 play by Sarah Ruhl
 Euridice (Caccini), a 1602 opera by Giulio Caccini
 Euridice (Peri), a 1600 opera by Jacopo Peri
 Eurydice (Aucoin), a 2020 opera by Matthew Aucoin
 Eurydice, a modern poem by Carol Ann Duffy
 Eurydice, a poem by Harryette Mullen
 Eurydice, a painting by Ludwig Löfftz
 "Eurydice", a song by Sleepthief with vocals by Jody Quine
 "Eurydice", a song from the 1971 album Weather Report
 "Eurydice", a song by The Crüxshadows
 Eurydice or Patsy Stone, a character in the UK television series Absolutely Fabulous

Ships
 , a post ship which was broken up in 1834
 , a post ship, later a training ship which foundered in 1878
 , launched in 1962 and lost in 1970
 Eurydice (1797 ship), primarily a West Indiaman

Other uses
 Eurydice (crustacean), a genus of isopod crustaceans
 Eurydice (magazine), Greek language magazine in the Ottoman Empire
 Eurydice Network, the Information Network on Education in Europe
 Eurydice Peninsula, Antarctica
 75 Eurydike, an asteroid
 Ctenotus eurydice, a species of lizard
 Gerrhopilus eurydice, a species of snake